Ephraim Ben-Artzi  (1910-2001) was an Israeli general and businessman.

Biography
Ephraim Kobrinsky (later Ben-Artzi) was born in Slonim, Poland.  He immigrated to Mandate Palestine in 1924. He was married to interior decorator Dora Gad.

Military career

In 1935, he joined the Haganah. During the Second World War he joined the British Army and was among the first Jewish officers holding the rank of major. He was discharged in 1946 at the rank of lieutenant colonel.

In 1948 he was appointed deputy head of the Quartermasters Directorate. Later he was served as an Israeli military attaché in North America. In 1950, upon his return to Israel,  he was promoted to the rank of Aluf and served until 1952 as head of the Quartermasters Directorate.

Business career
Ben-Artzi was executive director of Mekorot from 1952 to 1955 and executive director of El Al from 1956 to 1967.

References

2001 deaths
1910 births
Polish emigrants to Mandatory Palestine
Israeli Jews